Jonathan Jabari Farinha (born 16 May 1996) is a Trinidadian sprinter.

He finished fourth in the boys' 200 metres at the 2012 Central American and Caribbean Junior Championships, in a personal best of 21.16 seconds. He currently attends the University of Technology Jamaica where he trains.

References

External links

1996 births
Living people
Trinidad and Tobago male sprinters
Athletes (track and field) at the 2018 Commonwealth Games
Commonwealth Games competitors for Trinidad and Tobago